Acacia chrysotricha, commonly known as the Newry golden wattle or the Bellinger River wattle, is a species of Acacia native to eastern Australia. The species was listed as endangered in 2012 with the International Union for Conservation of Nature and Natural Resources.

Description
It inconspicuously ridged branchlets that have a surface densely covered with spreading golden, grey or fawn coloured hairs. The tips of immature foliage is villous and a deep golden colour. The leaves are a dark green colour but lighter underneath.
It flowers between July and August producing golden coloured flowers. The simple inflorescences are situated in axillary racemes. The spherical flower-heads contain 15 to 30 loosely packed golden flower. The tree is reasonably short lived and requires fire to stimulate germination.

Distribution
In is endemic to a small area in the north eastern corner of New South Wales within the Brierfield- Newry State Forest region where it is often situated in steep narrow gullies growing in quartzite based soils as a part of tall open forest communities or in rainforest communities as a component of the understory.

See also
 List of Acacia species

References

chrysotricha
Fabales of Australia
Flora of New South Wales
Plants described in 1966